is a passenger railway station located in the city of Yokkaichi, Mie Prefecture, Japan, operated by the private railway operator Sangi Railway.

Lines
Hobo Station is served by the Sangi Line, and is located 9.5 kilometres from the terminus of the line at Kintetsu-Tomida Station.

Layout
The station consists of a single island platform connected to the station building by a level crossing.

Platforms

Adjacent stations

History
Hobo Station was opened on July 23, 1931.

Passenger statistics
In fiscal 2019, the station was used by an average of 583 passengers daily (boarding passengers only).

Surrounding area
Yokkaichi City Hall Hobo District Citizen Center
Yokkaichi Municipal Hobo Elementary School
Yokkaichi Municipal Hobo Junior High School*
Mie Prefectural Asahi High School

See also
List of railway stations in Japan

References

External links

Sangi Railway official home page

Railway stations in Japan opened in 1931
Railway stations in Mie Prefecture
Yokkaichi